Frank Annoh-Dompreh (born 25 October 1977) is a Ghanaian politician and consultant. He is a member of the New Patriotic Party and the incumbent Member of Parliament for Nsawam-Adoagyiri. He is the chairperson for the Parliamentary Select Committee on Foreign Affairs and a member of the Subsidiary Legislation and Roads and Transport Committee.

Early life 
Annoh-Dompreh was born in 1977 at Nsawam-Adoagyiri, Eastern Region, Ghana. He graduated from the University of Cape Coast with a Bachelor of Science in agriculture. He also studied at Mountcrest University where he obtained LLB and LLM.

Politics 
Annoh-Dompreh started his engagement in politics as student politician when he contested and was elected as president of the National Union of Ghana Students (NUGS) whiles a student of the university of Cape Coast in 2000. He was selected as the Eastern regional Youth Organizer for the New Patriotic Party. In 2012, He contested in the Nsawam/Adoagyiri NPP Parliamentary primaries against Seth Wiafe Danquah and was given the nod by delegates in the constituency to represent them in the 2012 Ghanaian parliamentary election by obtaining 366 out of the 482 votes cast. He proceed to win the seat against Ben Ohene-ayeh of the NDC. He retained his seat in the 2016 Ghanaian parliamentary election. He is also a member of the Parliamentary Select Committees on Subsidiary Legislation and Roads & Transport.

Committees 
Annoh-Dompreh is the Vice-chairperson of the Housing Committee. He is also a member of the Finance Committee; a member of the Education Committee; a member of the Foreign Affairs Committee, a member of the Appointments Committee, a member of the Business Committee and also a member of the Committee of Selection Committee.

Personal life 
Annoh-Dompreh is a Christian and attends the Church of Pentecost. He is married with three children.

References

External links 
 Profile on Parliament of Ghana website

1977 births
Living people
Ghanaian Pentecostals
Ghanaian MPs 2013–2017
University of Cape Coast alumni
New Patriotic Party politicians
Ghanaian MPs 2021–2025
People from Eastern Region (Ghana)